Le Cornu is a surname originally of French origin, and in particular from Calvados and the area around Bayeux. It has a number of variants, including 'Cornu', 'Lecornue', 'Lecornu' and 'Cornut'. Tosti comments that it was 'a name that some bearers found difficult to wear as it immediately and incontrovertibly evoked a horned person, or a cuckold'. However, this has been challenged by M.T. Morlet who comments that this identification of horns with a husband who has been cheated on only came into being at the end of the Middle Ages. The discussion continues, although Tosti accepts Dauzat's view that the idea of a cuckold is found from the 13th century onwards and that 'it is this interpretation which will undoubtedly stand the test of time'.

The variant 'Lecorne' is found in the Nord-Pas-de-Calais (Hauts de France) area of France where a feminine form 'Lacorne' is also found. In this case, while also carrying the meaning of 'horned person' it is understood to refer to a horn or trumpet player, which in turn indicates a rather naive individual.

From the 15th century onwards, it has been a common surname in the Channel Islands, most notably in Jersey where it remains strongly identified with the island. Possibly the oldest record of a Le Cornu family in Jersey is that of Jean Le Cornu (1480 - ?).

Notable people with that name include:
Craig Le Cornu (born 1960), English association football player
Léon Lecornu (1854–1940), French engineer and physicist
Patrice Lecornu (born 1958), French association football player
Phillip Joshua Le Cornu, founder of the company Le Cornu in Adelaide (open 1861-2016)
Sébastien Lecornu (born 1986), French politician

See also
Ogier & Le Cornu,  a law firm merged into the Ogier Group
Cornu (disambiguation)

References